Athens Technical College ("Athens Tech") is a unit of the Technical College System of Georgia (TCSG) in Athens, Georgia.  It was founded in 1958 as Athens Area Vocational-Technical School. The school was renamed Athens Area Technical Institute in 1987 and took its current name in 2000.  It offers certificates, diplomas, and associate degrees in business, health, technical, and manufacturing-related fields.

The school's administrative offices and main campus are located in Athens, with satellite campuses located in Elberton, Greensboro, and Monroe, Georgia.  In addition, the school also has several educational centers in the school's surrounding ten-county service area.
Director of ATC: Mr. Bill Barton was appointed as the new Director over the Athens Technical College (ATC) campus in Monroe, Georgia. He is in charge of dual enrollment in addition to the ATC programs.

References

External links
Athens Technical College website

Buildings and structures in Athens, Georgia
Education in Clarke County, Georgia
Education in Elbert County, Georgia
Education in Greene County, Georgia
Education in Walton County, Georgia
1958 establishments in Georgia (U.S. state)
Educational institutions established in 1958
Universities and colleges accredited by the Southern Association of Colleges and Schools
Technical College System of Georgia